Grand Prix is 2010 South Korean sports film directed by Yang Yun-ho. It stars Kim Tae-hee and Yang Dong-geun in lead roles as horse jockeys.

Plot
Seo Ju-hee is a horse jockey who dreams of winning the Grand Prix championship. One day, she suffers an accident during a horse race. Her beloved horse is put down and she injures her arm. Feeling as if her dreams were crushed, Seo Ju-hee falls into depression and quits horse racing. Then, Seo Ju-hee decides to go to Jeju for a vacation. There, she meets Woo-suk, a fellow horse jockey who has previously won the championship. They fall in love and he helps and encourages her to make a comeback at the Grand Prix Championship.

Cast
Kim Tae-hee as Seo Ju-hee
Yang Dong-geun as Lee Woo-suk 
Park Geun-hyung as Hwang Man-chul
Go Doo-shim as Ko Yu-jeong
Lee Hye-eun as Oh Kang-ja 
Park Hee-von as Lee Da-som
Park Sa-rang as Yang So-shim
Song Jae-rim as In-jae
Woo Hyun as Park Kwang-ho

Production 
Lee Joon-gi was originally cast as the male lead and took part in the first month of filming. However he dropped out when the Military Manpower Administration declined his application to postpone enlistment for mandatory military service. His role was subsequently re-cast with Yang Dong-geun, as his comeback project after being discharged from military service.

References

External links
  
 
 
 
 

2010 films
2010s Korean-language films
2010s romance films
2010s sports drama films
South Korean romance films
South Korean sports drama films
Sidus Pictures films
2010s South Korean films